is a carbonaceous asteroid of the Apollo group, classified as near-Earth object and potentially hazardous asteroid, approximately 0.2 kilometers in diameter. It was discovered on 3 September 2002, by the Campo Imperatore Near-Earth Object Survey (CINEOS) at the Italian Campo Imperatore Observatory, located in the Abruzzo region, east of Rome.

Orbit and classification 

 orbits the Sun at a distance of 0.8–1.5 AU once every 1 years and 2 months (428 days). Its orbit has an eccentricity of 0.31 and an inclination of 5° with respect to the ecliptic.

Physical characteristics 

The carbonaceous C-type asteroid is also classified as a C/X-type body according to the survey carried out by NASA's Spitzer Space Telescope.

Lightcurve 

The ambiguous lightcurve rendered a rotation period of  hours with a brightness variation of 0.72 magnitude, while a second solution gave 6.096 hours (or half of the first period) with an amplitude of 0.43.

The Collaborative Asteroid Lightcurve Link assumes a standard albedo for stony asteroids of 0.20 and calculates diameter of 225 meters with an absolute magnitude of 20.6.

Naming 

As of 2017, this minor planet remains unnamed.

References

External links 
  
 Asteroid Lightcurve Database (LCDB), query form (info )
 Dictionary of Minor Planet Names, Google books
 Asteroids and comets rotation curves, CdR – Observatoire de Genève, Raoul Behrend
 
 
 

416151
416151
416151
20150220
20020903